Tötensen is a village near Hamburg, Germany. The village belongs to the municipality of Rosengarten (district of Harburg).

References

Villages in Lower Saxony